Raphaela Boaheng Lukudo (born 29 July 1994) is an Italian sprinter specialized in the 400 m, who won four medals at international senior level with Italian national track relay team of the 4×400 m relay.

Biography
Born in Aversa, Italy to Sudanese parents, she moved to Modena at the age of two. In 2006, she started to practice athletics with Mollificio Modenese Cittadella under the guidance of Mario Romano. She took part in the 2011 World Youth Championships in Athletics, for her first time with the Italy national athletics team, in Lille conquering the 400-meter semi-final despite an injury close to the competition. She competed in the women's 400 metres at the 2018 IAAF World Indoor Championships. Than, always in 2018 she won a gold medal, with the national track relay team at the 2018 Mediterranean Games.

Achievements
Senior level

National records
 4x400 metres relay indoor: 3:31.55 (Birmingham, England, 4 March 2018 with Ayomide Folorunso, Chiara Bazzoni, Maria Enrica Spacca)
 Mixed 4 × 400 metres relay: 3:16.15 (Yokohama, Japan, 11 May 2019 with Davide Re, Giancarla Trevisan, Andrew Howe); current holder

National titles
Italian Athletics Indoor Championships
 400 metres: 2018, 2019

See also
 List of Italian records in athletics
 List of Mediterranean Games records in athletics
 Naturalized athletes of Italy
 Italian national track relay team

References

External links
 

1994 births
Living people
People from Aversa
Italian female sprinters
Athletes (track and field) at the 2018 Mediterranean Games
Athletics competitors of Gruppo Sportivo Esercito
Italian people of Sudanese descent
Italian sportspeople of African descent
Mediterranean Games medalists in athletics
Mediterranean Games gold medalists for Italy
Mediterranean Games silver medalists for Italy
World Athletics Championships athletes for Italy
Sportspeople from the Province of Caserta
Sportspeople from Modena
20th-century Italian women
21st-century Italian women
Athletes (track and field) at the 2022 Mediterranean Games